Benuzzi is an Italian surname. Notable people with the surname include:

 Dario Benuzzi (born 1946), Italian test driver
 Felice Benuzzi (born 1910), Italian mountaineer, author of No Picnic on Mount Kenya

See also
 Benazzi

Italian-language surnames